The Wientjes Barn and Ranch Yard are a historic farm property in rural Campbell County, South Dakota. It consists of a barn and ranch yard located amid other farm buildings near the junction of 299th Avenue and 117th Street, west-southwest of Mound City. The barn, built in 1909, is a large wood-frame structure with a gambrel roof and integral shed extensions on the long sides, bringing the structure to a shape that is  square. The yard is divided into several sections, with corrals south and west of the barn, with a calf shed measuring  where the two corrals meet. The barn was built by Claus Wientjes, a Dutch immigrant, and is a high quality example of the increasingly rare rural South Dakota barn.

The ranch yard and barn were listed on the National Register of Historic Places in 2013.

References

Buildings and structures completed in 1901
Buildings and structures in Campbell County, South Dakota
Barns on the National Register of Historic Places in South Dakota
Barns in South Dakota
National Register of Historic Places in Campbell County, South Dakota